Edavappathy is a 2016 Indian Malayalam-language drama film written and directed by Lenin Rajendran. It deals with the story of the mental conflicts of a Tibetan Buddhist priest. Siddharth Lama plays the male lead with Utthara Unni opposite him. Manisha Koirala also plays a leading role.

Art director was Suresh Kollam. Mohan Sitara and Ramesh Narayan composed the music. The film won three Kerala State Film Awards.

Cast

 Siddharth Lama as Siddharath / Upagupta (Voice dubbed by Sharath Das)
 Manisha Koirala as Sumithra / Mathangi (Voice dubbed by Praveena and Bhagyalakshmi)
 Utthara Unni  as Vasavadatta / Yamini (Voice dubbed by Angel Shijoy)

Awards
46th Kerala State Film Awards
 Best Music Director : Ramesh Narayan
 Best Singer : Madhushree Narayan
 Best Dubbing Artist : Sharath Das

Kerala Film Critics Awards
 Best Screenplay : Lenin Rajendran
 Best Female Debut - Utthara Unni
 Best Makeup Artist -

Soundtrack

References

External links
 

2010s Malayalam-language films
Films directed by Lenin Rajendran